Soulstorm may refer to:

Oddworld: Soulstorm
Warhammer 40,000: Dawn of War – Soulstorm